Intimate partner sexual violence (IPSV) deals with sexual violence within the context of domestic violence. Intimate partner sexual violence is defined by any unwanted sexual contact or activity by an intimate partner in order to control an individual through fear, threats, or violence. Women are the primary victims of this type of violence.

Domestic violence and sexual abuse
Domestic sexual violence, such as forced sex or marital rape, may follow or be part of physical abuse, but is not always the case. In Mexico and the United States, studies estimate that 40–52% of women experiencing physical violence by an intimate partner have also been sexually coerced by that partner. 

Sexual violence may occur without physical violence. In the Indian state of Uttar Pradesh, in a representative sample of over 6000 men, 7% reported having sexually and physically abused their wives, 22% reported using sexual violence without physical violence and 17% reported that they had used physical violence alone.

The percentage of women who are victims of physical and/or sexual violence by an intimate partner is around seventy.

Types of coercion 
Aggressors can use different techniques to sexually abuse their partner.

Emotional coercion 
Emotional coercion can be seen through the use of threats, manipulation, harassment, and neglect. A study shows that the harm done through this type of coercion is comparable to that done by rape.

Threats to a third party 
Threats to a third party involve threatening the intimate partner to do what the male wants or else he will inflict pain on people she cherishes.

Threats of harm to the victim 
Threats of harm to the victim imply threatening to inflict pain on the victim, whether by the intimate partner or by outsiders.

Physical force 
Physical force is the use of objects, substances, and/or one's own body to obtain sex. Homicide committed by an intimate partner is often preceded by sexual acts obtained through physical force.

Health effects 
Intimate partner sexual violence is linked to sexual, physical, psychological, and reproductive damage. The effects can vary in duration.

Women who are victims of intimate partner sexual violence are at high risk of getting HIV and STIs. One reason for this is that men who are violent in this manner usually have dangerous habits like engaging in sexual acts with many individuals.

Victims of intimate partner sexual violence are also at risk of having undesirable pregnancies, abortions, miscarriages, and stillbirths. Infertility is another possible consequence of this violence on women.

Young victims of intimate partner sexual violence can come to adopt unhealthy behaviors such as the use of alcohol and drugs.

Children who have seen intimate partner sexual violence are profoundly affected psychologically. They can experience post-traumatic stress disorder, depression, and anxiety. Children are likely to incorporate what they see into their belief systems because they are accustomed to it.

Incidence by country
Studies indicate that sexual assault by an intimate partner is neither rare nor unique to any particular region of the world. For instance, 23% of women in North London, England, reported having been the victim of either an attempted or completed rape by a partner in their lifetime. Similar figures have been reported for Guadalajara, Mexico (23.0%), León, Nicaragua, (21.7%), Lima, Peru (22.5%), and for the Midlands Province in Zimbabwe (25.0%). The prevalence of women sexually assaulted by an intimate partner in their lifetime (including attempted assaults) has also been estimated in a few national surveys (for example, Canada 8.0%, England, Wales and Scotland (combined) 14.2%, Finland 5.9%, Switzerland 11.6% and the United States 7.7%, Nigeria 22.3). in France According to estimates, 220,000 women are victims of violence, 94,000 are raped each year and at least 100 were killed by their partners in 2021. Around 30% of sexual violence offenders were found to have committed violence before, 29% of complaints cases failed to move from police to the judiciary and 80% are closed without getting justice.

The table below summarizes some available data on the prevalence of sexual coercion by intimate partners.

See also
Domestic violence
Intimate partner violence
Marital rape
Sexual assault
Thordis Elva - Rape victim who collaborated with her assailant to author a book about the experience

References

External links

National organizations
 MenCanStopRape.org
 Rape, Abuse & Incest National Network, the United States' largest anti-sexual assault organization.
 Sexual Assault Care Centre Scarborough, An extensive resource for victims/survivors of sexual assault.

Support organizations
Casualspace, online support group with forums, mobile ready chat rooms, and blogs. Resources and information on several categories pertaining to abuse.
 After Silence, online support group and forums and chat room for survivors of rape and sexual abuse, and their supporters.
 Pandora's Aquarium, an online support group, message board, and chat room for sexual assault survivors and their supporters.
 Support for Victims and Their Family, Support for Victims and Their Family

Research and information
 Award Winning Documentary on Sexual Assault and Healing
 Rape Crisis Information Pathfinder- research on sexual assault
 U.S. Army Sexual Assault Prevention & Response Program

Medical emergencies
Intimate partner violence
Gender and society
Sexism
Criminology
Rape
Sexual violence

ar:إعتداء جنسي
ca:Agressió sexual
de:Sexuelle Nötigung
he:תקיפה מינית
nl:Aanranding
ja:性的暴行